Comfort Tyler (February 22, 1764 - August 5, 1827), one of the original settlers of modern Syracuse, New York, brought his family in the spring of 1788 to what became the hamlet of Onondaga Hollow on the future Seneca Turnpike, south of the city's center today.  He joined Asa Danforth and Ephraim Webster, the first whites to settle there, who had obtained permission to live there from the Onondaga. Tyler built the more ambitious house in Onondaga Hollow and contributed his engineering skills to the development of Central New York.

External links
Colonel Comfort Tyler at Onondaga
Comfort Tyler Memorial Pyramid in Oakwood Cemetery
Colonel Comfort Tyler memorial

1764 births
1827 deaths
Military personnel from Syracuse, New York
American pioneers
Burials at Oakwood Cemetery (Syracuse, New York)
People from Ashford, Connecticut
People from Manlius, New York
People from Onondaga County, New York
New York (state) Federalists